Visceral pain is pain that results from the activation of nociceptors of the thoracic, pelvic, or abdominal viscera (organs). Visceral structures are highly sensitive to distension (stretch), ischemia and inflammation, but relatively insensitive to other stimuli that normally evoke pain such as cutting or burning. Visceral pain is diffuse, difficult to localize and often referred to a distant, usually superficial, structure. It may be accompanied by symptoms such as nausea, vomiting, changes in vital signs as well as emotional manifestations. The pain may be described as sickening, deep, squeezing, and dull. Distinct structural lesions or biochemical abnormalities explain this type of pain in only a proportion of patients. These diseases are grouped under gastrointestinal neuromuscular diseases (GINMD). Others can experience occasional visceral pains, often very intense in nature, without any evidence of structural, biochemical or histolopathologic reason for such symptoms. These diseases are grouped under functional gastrointestinal disorders (FGID) and the pathophysiology and treatment can vary greatly from GINMD. The two major single entities among functional disorders of the gut are functional dyspepsia and irritable bowel syndrome.

Visceral hypersensitivity is hypersensitive visceral pain perception, which is commonly experienced by individuals with functional gastrointestinal disorders.

Epidemiology

In the past viscera were considered insensitive to pain but now it is clear that pain from internal organs is widespread and that its social burden may surpass that of pain from superficial (somatic) sources. Myocardial ischemia, the most frequent cause of cardiac pain, is the most common cause of death in the United States.Urinary colic produced from ureteral stones has been categorized as one of the most intense forms of pain that a human being can experience. The prevalence of such stones has continuously increased, reaching values of over 20% in developed countries. Surveys have shown prevalence rates among adults of 25% for intermittent abdominal pain and 20% for chest pain; 24% of women suffer from pelvic pain at any point in time. For over two-thirds of sufferers, pain is accepted as part of daily life and symptoms are self-managed; a small proportion defer to specialists for help. Visceral pain conditions are associated with diminished quality of life, and exert a huge cost burden through medical expenses and lost productivity in the workplace.

Clinical presentation 

Visceral pain should be suspected when vague midline sensations of malaise are reported by a patient. True visceral pain is characterized as a vague, diffuse, and poorly defined sensation. Regardless of specific organ of origin, the pain is usually perceived in the midline spanning anywhere from the lower abdomen up to the chest. In the early phases the pain is perceived in the same general area and it has a temporal evolution, making the onset sensation insidious and difficult to identify.

The pain is typically associated with involvement of the autonomic nervous system. Some of these symptoms include pallor, sweating, nausea, vomit, changes in vital signs including blood pressure, heart rate and/or temperature. Strong emotional reactions are also common presenting signs and may include anxiety, anguish and a sense of impending doom. Visceral pathology may also manifest only through emotional reactions and discomfort where no pain is reported. The intensity of visceral pain felt might have no relationship to the extent of internal injury.

Visceral pain changes in nature as it progresses. Pain from a specific organ can be experienced, or "referred" to different sites of the body. There is no pathology or no cause for pain at these referred somatic sites however the pain will be experienced at this location, often with significant intensity. Referred pain is sharper, better localized, and less likely to be accompanied by autonomic or emotional signs.

A good example of visceral pain that is common place and embodies the wide spectrum of clinical presentations discussed above is a myocardial infarction (MI), more commonly known as a heart attack. This pain is secondary to ischemia of the cardiac tissue. The most common presenting symptom is chest pain that is often described as tightness, pressure or squeezing. The onset of symptoms is usually gradual, over several minutes and tends to be located in the central chest (overlying the sternum) although it can be experienced in the left chest, right chest, and even abdominal area. Associated symptoms, which are mostly autonomic in nature, include diaphoresis, nausea, vomiting, palpitations, and anxiety (which is often described as a sense of impending doom). Referred pain is experienced most commonly radiating down the left arm however it can also radiate to the lower jaw, neck, back and epigastrium. Some patients, especially elderly and diabetics, may present with what is known as a painless myocardial infarction or a "silent heart attack". A painless MI can present with all of the associated symptoms of a heart attack, including nausea, vomiting, anxiety, heaviness, or choking, but the classic chest pain described above is lacking.

It is always important for not only the physician but also the patient to remember the dissociation between magnitude of injury to internal organs and the intensity of pain and how this can be potentially dangerous if overlooked, for example a silent heart attack. More rarely intense visceral pain does not signify a significant pathologic process, for example intense gas pains.

Neurobiology 

The vague and poorly defined sensation as well as its temporal nature, characteristic of visceral pain, is due to the low density of sensory innervation of viscera and the extensive divergence of visceral input within the central nervous system (CNS).
The phenomenon of referred pain is secondary to the convergence of visceral afferent (sensory) nerve fibers entering the spinal cord at the same level as the superficial, somatic structures experiencing the pain. This leads to a misinterpretation of incoming signals by higher brain centers.

Treatment 

There are two goals when treating visceral pain: to alleviate the current experience of pain and to address any underlying pathology, if and when identifiable. Treatment of the pain in many circumstances should be deferred until the origin of the symptoms has been identified. Masking pain may confound the diagnostic process and delay the recognition of life-threatening conditions. Once a treatable condition has been identified there is no reason to withhold symptomatic treatment. Also, if cause for the pain is not found in reasonable time then symptomatic treatment of the pain could be of benefit to the patient in order to prevent long-term sensitization and provide immediate relief.

Symptomatic treatment of visceral pain relies primarily upon pharmacotherapy. Since visceral pain can result secondary to a wide variety of causes, with or without associated pathology, a wide variety of pharmacological classes of drugs are used including a variety of analgesics (ex. opiates, NSAIDs, benzodiazepines), antispasmodics (ex. loperamide), antidepressants (ex. TCA, SSRI, SNRI) as well as others (ex. ketamine, clonidine, gabapentin). In addition, pharmacotherapy that targets the underlying cause of the pain can help alleviate symptoms due to lessening visceral nociceptive inputs. For example, the use of nitrates can reduce anginal pain by dilating the coronary arteries and thus reducing the ischemia causing the pain. The use of spasmolytics (antispasmodics) can help alleviate pain from a gastrointestinal obstruction by inhibiting the contraction of the gut. There are issues associated with pharmacotherapy that include side effects (ex. constipation associated with opiate use), chemical dependence or addiction, and inadequate pain relief.

Invasive therapies are in general reserved for patients in whom pharmacological and other non-invasive therapies are ineffective. A wide variety of interventions are available and shown to be effective, a few will be discussed here. Approximately 50–80% of pelvic cancer pain patients benefit from nerve blocks. Nerve blocks offer temporary relief and typically involve injection of a nerve bundle with either a local anesthetic, a steroid, or both. Permanent nerve block can be produced by destruction of nerve tissue. Strong evidence from multiple randomized controlled trials support the use of neurolytic celiac plexus block to alleviate pain and reduce opioid consumption in patients with malignant pain originating from abdominal viscera such as the pancreas. Neurostimulation, from a device such as a spinal cord stimulator (SCS), for refractory angina has been shown to be effective in several randomized controlled trials. A SCS may also be used for other chronic pain conditions such as chronic pancreatitis and familial Mediterranean fever. Other devices that have shown benefit in reducing pain include transcutaneous electrical nerve stimulators (TENS), targeted field stimulation, both used for somatic hyperalgesic states, external neuromodulation, pulsed radiofrequency ablation and neuraxial drug delivery systems.

References 

Pain
Physiology